Bong is a hamlet in the Dutch province of Limburg. It is located in the municipality of Venlo, about 2 km north of Velden, Limburg.

References

Populated places in Limburg (Netherlands)
Venlo